Jinlongshan, formerly Daling Township until October 2010, is a town in the southeast of Acheng District, Harbin, China, located more than  southeast of the urban area of Harbin. Near the town is the Mount Hengtou National Forest Park.

See also
List of township-level divisions of Heilongjiang

References

Township-level divisions of Heilongjiang